Jason Stephan  is a Canadian politician elected in the 2019 Alberta general election to represent the electoral district of Red Deer-South in the 30th Alberta Legislature. He is a member of the United Conservative Party. Stephan is a tax lawyer, chartered accountant, and founder of the Red Deer Taxpayers Association.

Political Activity 
MLA Stephan currently serves on the Standing Committee on Alberta's Economic Future as well as the Standing Committee on Public Accounts. Mr. Stephan has previously served on the Select Special Committee to Examine Safe Supply, the Standing Committee on Privileges and Elections, Standing Orders and Printing, as well as the Select Special Information and Privacy Commissioner Search Committee among others.

Jason Stephan has been a outspoken critic of Canada's equalization system and of the federal government's Just Transition Plan, often speaking to them as ways the federal government takes advantage of Alberta.

As a legislator, MLA Stephan has pushed for accountability on multiple projects, including the AHS expansion of the Red Deer Hospital and more funding into primary care.

In January 2021, Stephan was found to be vacationing in Phoenix, Arizona, during the ongoing COVID-19 pandemic and was asked to resign from his position on the Treasury Board as a result. He defended his choice by stating that “International travel, in and of itself, does not negatively impact Alberta’s COVID curve if it is done responsibly.” He also said that "I do not consider myself an exception to health guidelines. I have never asked Albertans to do things that I myself would not do – and that includes not travelling". Later that year, Stephan requested for a public inquiry into harms of COVID-19 restrictions, often being more critical of restrictions during the pandemic.

Electoral history

2019 general election

References

External Links 
Facebook post in which Mr. Stephan addresses his travel abroad. 

United Conservative Party MLAs
Living people
People from Red Deer, Alberta
21st-century Canadian politicians
Year of birth missing (living people)
Lawyers in Alberta